Band 1 and Band 2
 

 
 
 
  - expanded 
 (Translation) Walter Scott: Die Presbyterianer - Dritte Erzählungen meines Wirths. Zwickau 1826
 (Translation) Walter Scott: Der schwarze Zwerg - Erste der Erzählungen meines Wirths. Zwickau 1826
 (Translation)

Footnotes

Explanatory notes

Citations

References

External links
 
 

1797 births
1870 deaths

German women short story writers
German short story writers
German women novelists
German emigrants to the United States
English–German translators
Translators from Serbian
19th-century German novelists
19th-century American translators
19th-century American women writers
19th-century American novelists
19th-century American short story writers
19th-century German women writers